Arjen van der Heide (born 19 November 2001) is a Dutch professional footballer who plays as a forward for Eerste Divisie club Roda JC.

Professional career

Heerenveen
On 15 September 2017, Van der Heide signed his first professional contract with SC Heerenveen, a three-year deal. 

Van der Heide made his professional debut with Heerenveen in a 4–0 Eredivisie win over Heracles Almelo on 4 August 2019, replacing Jens Odgaard in the 89th minute.

Roda JC
On 30 July 2022, Van der Heide signed a three-year contract with Eerste Divisie club Roda JC.

References

External links
 
 Ons Oranje U16 Profile
 Ons Oranje U17 Profile
 Ons Oranje U18 Profile

2001 births
Living people
Sportspeople from Heerenveen
Dutch footballers
Netherlands youth international footballers
Association football forwards
Eredivisie players
Eerste Divisie players
SC Heerenveen players
Roda JC Kerkrade players
Footballers from Friesland